The 2015 Moselle Open was a men's tennis tournament held in Metz, France and played on indoor hard courts. It was the 13th edition of the Moselle Open, and part of the ATP World Tour 250 series of the 2015 ATP World Tour. It was held at the Arènes de Metz from 21 to 27 September 2015. Third-seeded Jo-Wilfried Tsonga won the singles title.

Singles main-draw entrants

Seeds

 1 Rankings are as of September 14, 2015.

Other entrants 
The following players received wild cards into the singles main draw:
  Pierre-Hugues Herbert
  Philipp Kohlschreiber
  Fernando Verdasco

The following players received entry from the singles qualifying draw:
  Vincent Millot
  Édouard Roger-Vasselin
  Kenny de Schepper
  Mischa Zverev

Withdrawals 
Before the tournament
  Julien Benneteau →replaced by Aleksandr Nedovyesov

During the tournament
  Stan Wawrinka

Doubles main-draw entrants

Seeds 

 Rankings are as of September 14, 2015

Other entrants 
The following pairs received wildcards into the doubles main draw:
  Gilles Müller /  Mike Scheidweiler
  Alexander Zverev /  Mischa Zverev

Finals

Singles 

  Jo-Wilfried Tsonga defeated  Gilles Simon, 7–6(7–5), 1–6, 6–2

Doubles 

  Łukasz Kubot /  Édouard Roger-Vasselin defeated  Pierre-Hugues Herbert /  Nicolas Mahut, 2–6, 6–3, [10–7]

External links
Official website